"That's Why Darkies Were Born" was a popular song written by Ray Henderson and Lew Brown. It originated in George White's Scandals of 1931, where white baritone Everett Marshall performed the song in blackface.

The song was most famously recorded by popular singer Kate Smith, whose rendition was a hit in 1931, and by award-winning singer, film star, scholar, and civil rights activist Paul Robeson. It was also featured in a 1931 all-star recording of a medley of songs from George White's Scandals, where it was sung by Frank Munn on Brunswick and just as famously part of Paul Whiteman medley sung by Native American jazz singer Mildred Bailey on Victor.

One verse runs:

Someone had to pick the cotton,
Someone had to plant the corn,
Someone had to slave and be able to sing,
That's why darkies were born.

The song was part of a fatalistic musical genre in the 1930s where African Americans were depicted as "fated to work the land, fated to be where they are, to never change." "That's Why Darkies Were Born" has been described as presenting a satirical view of racism, although others have said there is no evidence that the song was ever performed in a satirical or joking manner. The song was criticized as racist by African American audiences in the early 1930s, and Mildred Bailey received many letters from the public urging her to stop performing it in 1931.

In popular culture
The song is referenced in:

 The Marx Brothers film Duck Soup, when Groucho Marx's character Rufus T. Firefly says, "My father was a little headstrong, my mother was a little armstrong. The Headstrongs married the Armstrongs, and that's why darkies were born." Part of Marx's line, primarily the term "darkies," was removed from television prints of this film in the early 1970s.  The full dialogue was restored in 1980 for home video releases and future broadcast syndication. 
 Gordon and Revel's satirical song "Underneath the Harlem Moon", recorded by Don Redman in 1932 and by Randy Newman in 1970, explains: "They just live for dancing, They're never blue or forlorn, Ain't no sin to laugh or grin, That's why darkies were born."
 In the 1933 movie Rufus Jones for President (starring a 7-year-old Sammy Davis Jr.), Ethel Waters changed the words to: “That’s why we Schwartzes were born.”
William Dieterle's 1936 film Satan Met a Lady, when Arthur Treacher's character Anthony Travers begins to say "That's why..." and is cut off by Warren William's character Ted Shane who says sarcastically "...darkies were born."

2019 controversy
On April 18, 2019, the New York Yankees announced that Kate Smith's rendition of "God Bless America" would no longer be played at Yankee Stadium, citing "That's Why Darkies Were Born" along with another controversial song sung by Smith, "Pickaninny Heaven". The Philadelphia Flyers followed suit the next day, covering up a statue of Smith that stood outside the Wells Fargo Center, then removing the statue on April 21, 2019.

References

External links
  via Lyon College
 Paul Robeson - That's Why Darkies Were Born - 1931 via YouTube
 Kate Smith - That's Why Darkies Were Born - 1931 via YouTube

American songs
1931 songs
Paul Robeson songs
Kate Smith songs
Songs with music by Ray Henderson
Songs with lyrics by Lew Brown
Satirical songs
Comedy songs
Ethnic humour
Stereotypes of black people
Songs about black people
Black comedy music
Race-related controversies in music